Spencer Sautu (born 5 October 1994) is a Zambian professional footballer who currently plays as a midfielder for Power Dynamos.

International career

International goals
Scores and results list Zambia's goal tally first.

References

External links 
 

1994 births
Living people
Zambian footballers
Zambia international footballers
Zambia under-20 international footballers
Zambia youth international footballers
2015 Africa Cup of Nations players
2015 Africa U-23 Cup of Nations players
Green Eagles F.C. players
Power Dynamos F.C. players
Association football midfielders
Zambia A' international footballers
2016 African Nations Championship players
2020 African Nations Championship players